The Belarusian men's national under-20 ice hockey team is the national under-20 ice hockey team in Belarus. The team represented Belarus at the International Ice Hockey Federation's World Junior Hockey Championship. Prior to independence in 1991, Belarusian players played for the Soviet Union, which played in the World Juniors from its inception in 1974. Belarus has played in the top division eight times, first in 1999 and most recently in 2018, with their best finish being ninth overall in both 2001 and 2002. The most recent tournament, the 2019 tournament, had Belarus finished second in Division I, the second tier, and twelfth overall.

Due to the 2022 Russian invasion of Ukraine, the International Ice Hockey Federation banned all Belarusian national and club teams from its events indefinitely, and Hockey Canada banned Belarus’s “participation in events held in Canada that do not fall under the IIHF’s jurisdiction.”

History
Belarus became an independent nation in 1991, and the team made their first appearance at the World Junior Hockey Championships in 1998, when Belarus won Pool B (now Division I). The U20 team played at the 1999 World Junior Ice Hockey Championships in Winnipeg, but the Belarusians never won a game. Belarus finished 10th and were relegated to Pool B for 2000. The team returned to the top level by defeating Germany in the final. The Belarusians avoided relegation by winning and tying a game against the Kazakhs.

Belarus competed in the 2002 and 2003 World Junior Championships, until finally being relegated under the new IIHF format. Belarus returned to the top division in 2005, but were relegated again. Belarus has mainly been in the second-tier Division I level since then, though have been promoted to the top division on occasion, most recently in 2018.

World Junior Championship record

References

External links
Belarus at IIHF.com

Junior
Junior national ice hockey teams